Methallyl chloride is the organic compound with the formula CH2=C(CH3)CH2Cl.  It is a colorless liquid and a lacrymator.  Its properties are similar to those of allyl chloride.  It is a strong alkylating agent used to install isobutenyl groups.

Reactivity
It is also a precursor to methallyl ligand.  It is an isomer of crotyl chloride.

Methylenecyclopropane can be synthesised via an intramolecular cyclisation reaction from methallyl chloride by treatment with a strong base such as sodium amide.

References

Chloroalkenes
IARC Group 3 carcinogens
Allyl compounds